Celtic culture may refer to:

the culture of Celts
the culture of Celts (modern)
the culture of Celtic nations:
Culture of Ireland
Culture of Scotland
Culture of the Isle of Man
Culture of Wales
Culture of Cornwall
Culture of Brittany
Culture of Asturias
Galician culture

See also
 Celt (disambiguation)
 Celtic (disambiguation)
 Celtic identity
 Celtic Revival, a variety of movements and trends in the 19th and 20th centuries that saw a renewed interest in aspects of Celtic culture
 Gaels, an ethnolinguistic group native to Ireland, Scotland and the Isle of Man 
 Insular art, mostly originating from the Irish monastic movement of Celtic Christianity
 Celtic music, a broad grouping of music genres that evolved out of the folk music traditions of the Celtic people of Northwestern Europe

 
Indo-European culture